Atika Bouagaa (born 22 May 1982) is a volleyball player from Germany.

She represented her native country at the 2004 Summer Olympics, finishing in ninth place, at the 2002 FIVB Volleyball Women's World Championship in Germany, and at the 2003 Women's European Volleyball Championship, finishing third. 
On club level she played with Dresdner SC.

Honours
 2002 FIVB World Grand Prix — 3rd place
 2002 World Championship — 10th place
 2003 European Championship — 3rd place
 2004 Olympic Games — 9th place 
 2006 World Championship — 11th place
 2007 European Championship — 6th place

References

External links 
  
 
 
 

German women's volleyball players
Volleyball players at the 2004 Summer Olympics
Olympic volleyball players of Germany
People from Offenburg
Sportspeople from Freiburg (region)
1982 births
Living people